Harm's Way is an American straight edge hardcore punk band from Chicago, Illinois, formed in 2006. The band started as a side project, but ended up becoming a more serious and full-time band in their later years. Harm's Way has since released four studio albums: Reality Approaches (2009), Isolation (2011) and Rust (2015) and several EPs. On February 9, 2018, the band released their critically acclaimed Metal Blade Records debut, titled Posthuman. They have been recognized for their unique blend of metal, industrial, and hardcore music.

History
In 2006, the members of a straight edge punk band called Few and the Proud started a "side project-slash-joke" band to have fun playing short-and-fast powerviolence songs influenced by Crossed Out and Infest. Harm's Way drummer Chris Mills commented on the band's early days and progression, stating: "We'd play super fast powerviolence songs, and our singer would put on a mask and sing silly lyrics about beating up frat boys or whatever. Then, later as the band became more serious, we retired a lot of those elements and went in a more death metal direction—darker and less ridiculous, even if some aspects of it still weren't 100 percent serious." Harm's Way released several albums, EPs and singles through Organized Crime Records and Closed Casket Activities in their early days.

After the release of their 2011 second studio album Isolation, Harm's Way emailed Jacob Bannon (Converge) and his label Deathwish Inc. after hearing that he was a fan of the band's music to ask if the label would be interested in signing them. The band's signing to Deathwish was announced in March 2013. Harm's Way released the EP Blinded on July 23, 2013 featuring artwork by Florian Bertmer, and promoted it with a music video for the track "Mind Control" followed by a world tour. Mills commented on their positive relationship with the label, stating: "It's been awesome—they've been really helpful, we have a bigger budget, we were able to do a music video.  They've been willing to do anything we've really wanted. They're really supportive." The Blinded EP also saw the band incorporating more Godflesh-influenced industrial metal into their sound.

Harm's Way released its third studio album Rust through Deathwish on March 10, 2015 and promoted it with a music video for the track "Amongst the Rust." Commenting on the band's musical and imagery changes with Rust, Mills said: "We're still locked into these niches in people's minds—you know, meathead tough guy hardcore band, Satan-worshipping death metal band, whatever. We see Rust as not just a new musical phase—we're changing up the old logo and taking a different direction with the imagery to try to steer people away from generalizations and assumptions based on stuff that really doesn't represent who we are as people or musicians." The album was met with generally positive reviews. Writing for Rock Sound, Chris Hidden gave the album an eight-out-of-ten, and said: "This new record finds them in formidable form, with the likes of 'Amongst The Rust' and 'Cancerous Ways' blending the down-tuned riff attack of nu metal with groove-led thrash and the crushing intensity of hardcore to produce a sound that references everyone from Sepultura to Trapped Under Ice." Harm's Way began touring in support of Rust with a March/April 2015 North American tour with Code Orange and others, a May/June European tour, the European leg of Deathwish Fest and US headlining tour in July, and touring North American with The Black Dahlia Murder in October.

On 6 December 2017, the band announced their fourth studio album, and Metal Blade Records debut, titled Posthuman. The record was set for release on 9 February 2018, and was produced by Will Putney at Graphic Nature Audio. After the album release and a February–March US tour, Luca Cimarusti wrote for the Chicago Reader, "...they’ve finally fully realized their fascination with [Godflesh]. ...Posthuman is one of the darkest, heaviest records you’ll hear this year." A year later, Harm's Way released a four-song EP titled PSTHMN featuring industrial remixes of songs from Posthuman.

Musical style
The band's musical style has been described as hardcore punk, metalcore industrial metal, industrial, and death metal. The band's early work has been described as powerviolence. They also incorporate elements of groove metal, industrial, death metal, black metal, and nu metal into their sound. The band's music has been compared to bands like Code Orange, Slipknot, and Godflesh.

Band members
Current members
 James Pligge – lead vocals 
 Bo Lueders – guitars 
 Christopher Mills – drums 
 Nick Gauthier – guitars 
 Casey Soyk – bass 

Former members
 John Hoffman – guitars
 Jon Caution – bass
 Andrew Saba
 Jay Jancetic – guitars
 David Winslow Cronin

Discography

Studio albums
 Reality Approaches (2009, Organized Crime)
 Isolation (2011, Closed Casket Activities)
 Rust (2015, Deathwish)
 Posthuman (2018, Metal Blade)

Extended plays
 Imprisoned (2007, Organized Crime)
 Harm's Way (2008, Organized Crime)
 No Gods, No Masters (2010, Closed Casket Activities)
 Blinded (2013, Deathwish)
 PSTHMN (2019, Metal Blade)

Singles
 "Breeding Grounds" (2011, Closed Casket Activities)

Music videos
 "Mind Control" (2013)
 "Amongst the Rust" (2015)
 "Left to Disintegrate" (2015)
 "Become a Machine" (2018)

Notes

References

External links
 
 Harm's Way on Bandcamp
 
 Harm's Way discography at Rate Your Music

Hardcore punk groups from Illinois
Musical groups established in 2006
Deathwish Inc. artists
Musical groups from Chicago
Powerviolence groups
Straight edge groups
2006 establishments in Illinois